Francis Denzil Edward Baring, 5th Baron Ashburton, DL (20 July 1866 – 27 March 1938) was a British peer and politician.

Early life
Baring was the son of Alexander Hugh Baring, 4th Baron Ashburton, a Member of Parliament for Thetford, and Leonora Caroline Digby. He had four younger brothers: Capt. Frederick Arthur Baring, Alexander Henry Baring, Lt. Col. Guy Baring, MP for Winchester, and Caryl Digby Baring (who married Olive Alethea Smith, daughter of Hugh Colin Smith).

His maternal grandparents were Edward Digby, 9th Baron Digby and the former Lady Theresa Fox-Strangways (eldest daughter of Henry Fox-Strangways, 3rd Earl of Ilchester).  His paternal grandparents were MP Francis Baring, 3rd Baron Ashburton and Hortense Maret (a daughter of Hugues-Bernard Maret, duc de Bassano, the 12th Prime Minister of France).  Through his father's family, he was a member of the German Baring family and a descendant of American statesman William Bingham.

Career
He succeeded to the title of 5th Baron Ashburton, of Ashburton, Devon, on 18 July 1889 and took his seat in the House of Lords. He was an officer in the Hampshire Yeomanry (Carabiniers), where he was appointed a lieutenant on 17 August 1901, promoted to captain on 6 December 1902, and ended as major.

In 1891, Baring was appointed to be a Deputy Lieutenant of the County of Southampton.

Personal life
On 25 July 1889, he was married to Mabel Edith Hood, at St. George's Church, St. George Street, Hanover Square, London, England. Mabel was the eldest daughter of Francis Hood, 4th Viscount Hood and the former Edith Lydia Drummond Ward.  Before her death, they were the parents of four daughters and one son:

 Venetia Marjorie Mabel Baring (1890–1937), a Maid of Honour to Queen Mary.
 Aurea Versa Baring (1891–1975), who married Maj. Charles Balfour, a grandson of Mark McDonnell, 5th Earl of Antrim.
 Angela Mildred Baring (1893–1995), who died unmarried.
 Violet Alma Madeline Baring (1895–1924), who died unmarried.
 Alexander Francis St. Vincent Baring, 6th Baron Ashburton (1898–1991), who married Doris Harcourt, the eldest daughter of Lewis Harcourt, 1st Viscount Harcourt.

After the death of his first wife in 1904, he married the American actress Frances Donnelly, whose stage name was "Frances Belmont," on 19 February 1906. Frances, one of the original "Florodora" sextet of 1901, was a daughter of James Caryll Donnelly of New York.

One of Britain's foremost yachtsman, Lord Ashburton died of a heart attack aboard the RMS Queen Mary on 27 March 1938.  His widow died on 31 March 1959.

References

External links
 Hansard.millbanksystems.org
 Baringarchive.org.uk
 "Francis Denzil Edward Baring, 5th Baron Ashburton" at The Peerage

1866 births
1938 deaths
Francis
British people of American descent
British people of German descent
Deputy Lieutenants of Hampshire
Francis 5
Eldest sons of British hereditary barons
Hampshire Yeomanry officers